Advanced Placement (AP) Russian Language and Culture is a proposed Advanced Placement course and examination, in development since 2005. It is being developed through the American Council of Teachers of Russian, in collaboration with the College Board and with funding from the U.S. Department of Education and the National Security Education Program. The program was meant to launch between 2007–2008.

AP Russian Language is equivalent to a second-year college-level Russian language course. Students enrolling in AP Russian Language and Culture are typically in their fourth or fifth year of language study or have had equivalent experience with the language. The exam is reported with a score of 1 to 5. A prototype exam was administered to students in 2010. An unofficial exam was created and distributed by the American Council for International Education, and was split into four segments: reading and listening comprehension, integrated written communication, and oral proficiency overview. 190–200 minutes were allotted, with native speakers having ten fewer minutes than learned speakers.

After 2010, College Board removed all materials for this course and removed it from their website.

As of 2023, the College Board and the American Council of Teachers of Russian both recommend students who are interested in college-level credit for the Russian language take the NEWL® exam, administered by the American Councils for International Education.

References

Advanced Placement
Russian-language education